Rt. Hon. Sir, Ude Oko Chukwu (FCA)  (FCA)  (born January 1, 1962) is a Nigerian accountant and politician who currently serves as the Deputy Governor of Abia State after he was elected into office in 2015 under the platform of the People's Democratic Party. Prior to his swearing-in as Deputy Governor, he had served as the Speaker of the 5th Abia State House of Assembly.

Early life and education
Ude was born on 1 January  1962 into a Catholic family in Etitiama Nkporo, a town in the Ohafia local government area of Abia State. He completed his basic education at Etitiama Primary School, Nkporo and his secondary education at Nkporo Comprehensive Secondary School, Nkporo in 1970 and 1982 respectively.

Career

Accounting
Ude served as an accountant for SMACS Computers and General Manager, CONTECH Ventures Ltd. between 1988 and 1996 before he went on to establish Chukwu Ude Oko Chukwu and Co. (Chartered Accountants) in 2001. He is a fellow of the Institute of Chartered Accountants of Nigeria (FCA).

Politics
He became politically active in 2001 and in 2003 won a seat in the Abia State House of Assembly, representing Ohafia North Constituency. He was also elected Speaker of the 5th Abia State House of Assembly by Theodore Orji in 2011, a position he held until when he was elected as Deputy Governor of Abia State in 2015.

References

1962 births
Living people
People from Abia State
Deputy Governors of Abia State
University of Lagos alumni
Igbo politicians
21st-century Nigerian politicians
Peoples Democratic Party (Nigeria) politicians
Federal College of Education (Technical), Akoka alumni